Meredith Lee Molinari is an American model and reality show host, perhaps best known as the host of The Tester on the PlayStation® Network.

Career 
On February 18, 2010, Meredith Molinari's first reality series, The Tester, aired, which can be downloaded from the PlayStation Network on the PlayStation 3 and PSP. She continued as host through the third season of The Tester.

Filmography

Television
The Tester - host (2010–2012)
The Man - host (2012-2013)

References

Year of birth missing (living people)
Living people
American television personalities
American women television personalities